Atopophysa is a genus of moths in the family Geometridae.

Species
 Atopophysa candidula Inoue, 1986
 Atopophysa indistincta (Butler, 1889)
 Atopophysa lividata (Bastelberger, 1909)
 Atopophysa opulens Prout, 1914

References
 Atopophysa at Markku Savela's Lepidoptera and Some Other Life Forms

Larentiinae
Geometridae genera